The Heidelberger Frühling Music Award is an award given at the music festival Heidelberger Frühling in Heidelberg, Germany. The annually award is endowed with €10,000 and is awarded to creatives and journalists who have made a substantial and sustained contribution to bringing classical music to wider audiences, respectively to individuals who have made substantial and lasting contributions within the classical music education sector. The prize is donated by HeidelbergCement.

Recipients
 2013 Jörg Widmann, clarinetist, composer and conductor
 2014 Eleonore Büning, music journalist
 2015 Markus Hinterhäuser, pianist and cultural manager
 2016 Christian Gerhaher, baritone
 2017 Klaus Lauer, hotelier and festival director  (Römerbad-Musiktage, Badenweiler Musiktage)
 2018 Gabriela Montero, pianist
 2019 John Gilhooly, director of Wigmore Hall
 2020 Thomas Hampson, baritone
 2023 Martin Grubinger, percussionist

References

External links
  

German music awards
Classical music awards
Awards established in 2013
2013 establishments in Germany